On Ze Boulevard is a 1927 American comedy silent film directed by Harry F. Millarde and written by Earl Baldwin, William Scott Darling, Joseph Farnham and Richard Schayer. The film stars Lew Cody, Renée Adorée, Anton Vaverka, Dorothy Sebastian and Roy D'Arcy. The film was released on June 25, 1927, by Metro-Goldwyn-Mayer.

Plot

Cast 
Lew Cody as Gaston Pasqual
Renée Adorée as Musette
Anton Vaverka as Ribot
Dorothy Sebastian as Gaby de Sylva
Roy D'Arcy as Counnt de Guissac

References

External links 
 

1927 films
1920s English-language films
Silent American comedy films
1927 comedy films
Metro-Goldwyn-Mayer films
American black-and-white films
American silent feature films
Films with screenplays by Florence Ryerson
Films with screenplays by F. Hugh Herbert
Films directed by Harry F. Millarde
1920s American films
Films with screenplays by Richard Schayer